Robert Tillman Kendall (born July 13, 1935) is a Christian writer, speaker, and teacher who pastored Westminster Chapel for 25 years. He is author of more than 50 books, including Total Forgiveness. Kendall was part of the Word, Spirit, Power team, a non-denominational charismatic ministry.

Early life and family
Kendall was born July 13, 1935, in Ashland, Kentucky and named for R. T. Williams who was a general superintendent of the Church of the Nazarene. He married Louise Wallis of Sterling, Illinois on June 28, 1958. They had two children, Robert Tillman II (TR) and Melissa Louise. He received degrees at Trevecca Nazarene University in Nashville, Tennessee (A.B., 1970), the Southern Baptist Theological Seminary (M.Div., 1972) in Louisville, Kentucky and the University of Louisville (M.A., 1973) and a Doctor of Philosophy at Regent's Park College, a hall of the University of Oxford. He received a Doctor of Divinity from Trevecca Nazarene University (1988).

Ministry
At Oxford, Kendall was pastor of Calvary Baptist Church (now Brackley Baptist Church) in Lower Heyford from 1974 to 1977 which mainly served USAF families based at RAF Upper Heyford and RAF Croughton. From February 1, 1977, to February 1, 2002, he was the Minister at Westminster Chapel in London.

Kendall maintains a view that later Calvinism departed from the teaching of John Calvin on the issues of assurance and the extent of the atonement. Kendall expounded his views in his thesis, The Nature of Saving Faith, from William Perkins (d. 1602) to the Westminster Assembly (1642–1649) and his 1981 work Calvin and English Calvinism to 1649. Kendall's  views prompted a response by Paul Helm, who wrote Calvin and the Calvinists in 1982.

Kendall's 1983 publication of Once Saved, Always Saved on the nature of Christian perseverance prompted debate of antinomianism among chapel members and others.

His charismatic beliefs and affirmation of prophecies and association with Paul Cain and the Kansas City Prophets from the early 1990s were controversial.

In 2002, he was introduced by the Archbishop of Canterbury's Envoy to the Middle East to meet the Palestinian leader Yasser Arafat and discussed the Christian faith with him.

Kendall is retired but continues his work as an author and guest speaker at Christian conferences. He appears on Christian television and is a regular contributor to Christian publications. He is president of R.T. Kendall Ministries.

Works

Books
Kendall is the author of more than 50 books including:

 — republication of 'Tithing' from 1982 

 – republication of The Complete Guide to the Parables, 2004.

Articles and Chapters

References

External links
 Out of the Comfort Zone by RT Kendall Book review
 Ministry Homepage
 Second Chance review
 RT Kendall's thoughts Evangelism and Arthur Blessitt
 Kendall and Lloyd-Jones

1935 births
Living people
Baptist ministers from the United States
Alumni of Regent's Park College, Oxford
Southern Baptist Theological Seminary alumni
American evangelicals
Trevecca Nazarene University alumni
University of Louisville alumni
People from Ashland, Kentucky
Baptists from Kentucky